The International Federation of Secondary Teachers (FIPESO) was a global union federation bringing together trade unions representing secondary school teachers.

History
The federation was established in 1912 at a meeting in Brussels attended by unions from France, Belgium and the Netherlands.  Initially named the International Bureau of National Associations of Teachers in Public Secondary Schools, it became moribund during World War I, but was revived after the war and began growing.  By 1932, it had 26 affiliates, with a total of 100,000 members.  It became the "International Federation of Secondary Teachers" in 1935.

In 1921, the federation launched the International Bulletin journal, for the discussion of education issues.  After World War II, the federation also began campaigning on professional and social topics.  It built closer contacts with the International Federation of Teachers' Associations (IFTA), which represented primary school teachers, while with the International Teachers' Federation and World Organisation of the Teaching Profession (WOTP), it formed the loose Comité d'Entente, to lobby international organisations on education issues.

In 1952, FIPESO, the IFTA and the WOTP merged to form the World Confederation of Organizations of the Teaching Profession.  FIPESO continued as an autonomous section of the new federation.  Its membership initially grew, as secondary education expanded in many countries, but fell during the 1970s, rebounding in the 1980s as it attracted members in Africa, Latin America and Asia.  In 1993, it dissolved, its remaining members joining the new Education International.

Leadership

General Secretary
1921: Achille Beltette
1933: Charles Boulanger
1939: Janet M. Lawson
1954: Andrew Hutchings
1965: Émile Hombourger
1972: André Drubay
1982: Louis Weber

Presidents
1921: Albert Fedel
1930s: G. R. Parker
1940s: Karl Kärre
Émile Hombourger
H. Reinhardt
1965: Andrew Hutchings
1973: Franz Ebner
1977: Otto Kaltenborn
1981: Joyce Baird
1985: Ernst Kiel
1989: Kieran Mulvey
1991:

References

Global union federations
Education trade unions
Trade unions established in 1912
Trade unions disestablished in 1993